Sergey Vladimirovich Cherkasov, also known as Viktor Muller Ferreira, is an alleged Russian intelligence officer (operating as an "illegal" under a falsified identity) working for the GRU who had been discovered by the Dutch General Intelligence and Security Service. He was sentenced by a court to 15 years in prison for using a forged document in Brazil.

Known background
His Russian passport lists him as registered in Kaliningrad exclave and public registry data showed he was a co-owner of a Kaliningrad construction firm at the age of 19. His age is 36 and that of his alias is 33.

Cover story
The Dutch intelligence agency published a document in broken Portuguese that they said was his cover story. The document says that he went to Rio de Janeiro in August 2010 to meet his estranged father who he blamed for his problems, such as the death of his mother and aunt. The document claimed he had forgotten Portuguese, but said he moved to Brasília when he was supposedly 25. He claimed that he had forgotten the language and stayed in Brasil "to learn the language and restore my citizenship". Some details of the alleged background have been described as implausible.

The document mentions having to go to Ireland for the funeral of his father.

Education
According to a CV posted online, he studied political science at Trinity College Dublin from 2014 to 2018 for his first degree and then earned his Master's at in a prestigious international relations program at Johns Hopkins University's Paul H. Nitze School of Advanced International Studies (SAIS), majoring in United States foreign policy. He was a student of Evgeny Finkel.

While he was studying in Ireland he was known to Irish counter-intelligence.

Attempt to enter International Criminal Court
In April 2022 he flew to the Netherlands to take up a position at the International Criminal Court. He was detained by Dutch immigration officials and sent back to Brazil.

When he returned to Brazil he was arrested for identity fraud.

The ICC had begun investigating war crimes committed by the Russian army in Ukraine. Had he succeeded in getting a position he would have had access to the ICC email and document systems.

Reactions to discovery
Evgeny Finkel tweeted that the alleged spy was a former student who had claimed "Brazilian/Irish roots" and who had asked him for a reference letter for his application to the ICC. Finkel tweeted "I wrote him a letter. A strong one, in fact. Yes, me. I wrote a reference letter for a GRU officer. I will never get over this fact. I hate everything about GRU, him, this story. I am so glad he was exposed,"

The Dutch intelligence agency said "The threat posed by this intelligence officer is deemed potentially very high".

Donnacha Ó Beacháin, a Professor of Politics in the School of Law & Government Dublin City University, said it was not surprising that he was educated in Ireland, but it was surprising that he was caught. He added "Essentially these are sleeper agents. The idea would be that - from a young age- they would build up a fake identity, and they would acquire different qualifications and credentials that would make them more plausible. Then they will be used to infiltrate Western organisations. Trinity College would be a very credible university based in a friendly western country. So from that perspective, placing an operative in Trinity and giving them a background there would be something that can be utilised later."

References

People from Kaliningrad Oblast
Living people
GRU officers
Year of birth missing (living people)